The Little Niangua Suspension Bridge is a Little Niangua River crossing in Camden County, Missouri on Route J. It is a two lane heavy vehicle bridge.

History 
The bridge was constructed in 1933 by the Clinton Bridge Company. It was designed as a self-anchored bridge.

Status of bridge 
In October 2007, it was closed for much needed repairs. These repairs included fixing movement underneath the deck. In 2019, a new bridge was built to bypass the old bridge. The old bridge is not in use anymore. It remains standing since locals lobbied to not have it demolished.

Bridge Measurements 
Main Span-	       225 Feet
Side Spans-	       112 Feet
Deck Width-	       20 Feet

References 
 Suspension Bridges crossing Little Niangua River
 Historic Bridge - Little Niangua River Bridge

Buildings and structures in Camden County, Missouri
Road bridges in Missouri
Suspension bridges in Missouri